Jeremías Conan Ledesma (born 13 February 1993) is an Argentine professional footballer who plays as a goalkeeper for La Liga club Cádiz.

Club career
Ledesma had a spell in the ranks of Racing Club de Pergamino, which preceded a move to Rosario Central in 2006. He first appeared in the club's first-team squad in June 2013 when he was an unused substitute for Primera B Nacional matches versus Instituto and Deportivo Merlo. However, it took Ledesma almost five further seasons to make his professional debut. It eventually arrived on 25 April 2017 during a Copa Argentina game with Cañuelas, he played the full duration of a 1–0 win. Six months later, in October, he made his domestic league bow in the Argentine Primera División versus Tigre.

On 25 August 2020, Ledesma moved abroad for the first time in his career after agreeing to a one-year loan deal with La Liga newcomers Cádiz with a purchase option. His first appearance came in an away win against Athletic Bilbao on 1 October. His 100th career match arrived on 29 December in a goalless draw with Valladolid. Ledesma finished the 2020-21 season with 32 appearances before Cádiz triggered the purchase option on 22 May 2021, with Ledesma signing a deal with the Spanish club until the end of June 2025.

International career
In October 2020, Ledesma received a call-up from the Argentina senior squad under manager Lionel Scaloni; to replace the injured Juan Musso.

He was part of the Argentina under-23 squad at the 2020 Summer Olympics in Tokyo, as the overage players allowed per squad.

Career statistics

Club

Honours
Rosario Central
 Primera B Nacional: 2012–13
 Copa Argentina: 2017–18

References

External links

1993 births
Living people
Argentine footballers
Argentine expatriate footballers
People from Pergamino
Association football goalkeepers
Olympic footballers of Argentina
Footballers at the 2020 Summer Olympics
Primera Nacional players
Argentine Primera División players
La Liga players
Rosario Central footballers
Cádiz CF players
Argentine expatriate sportspeople in Spain
Expatriate footballers in Spain
Sportspeople from Buenos Aires Province